Sunrise over Lake Van is a 2011 Armenian drama film directed by Artak Igityan and Vahan Stepanyan. The film was screened at the 2011 Golden Apricot International Film Festival.

Cast
 Jean Pierre Nshanyan as Tigran
 Aren Vatyan as Gevorg
 Arevik Martirosyan
 Gunisigi Zan as Elise
 Karen Dzhangiryan as Karapeth

References

External links
 Sunrise over Lake Van at the National Cinema Center of Armenia
 

2011 films
Armenian-language films
2011 drama films
Armenian drama films